This is the discography of French DJ Cedric Gervais. Gervais has released two studio albums, one extended play, and 20 singles since he started in 2001 (including one as a featured artist). As of September 2018, Gervais has had two songs go 4× platinum according to ARIA, one song go 2× platinum in the US, and one song go platinum in the UK.

Cedric's debut single “Burning” was released in 2001, through Ultra Records' sub label, You. Shortly after in 2003, he released his first commercial DJ mix, The House Sessions. His debut album, Experiment, was released in October, 2006. This featured his major hit "Spirit in My Life", which was a huge turing point in his career. As he grew more in demand as a remix producer, he still continued to release original material through his labels, Sleaze and Sleaze Industry. In 2011, he released his next album, "Miamication". Since then he has released numerous singles through various labels and outlets.

Gervais' single "Molly", released on 3 July 2012, became one of Cedric's most commercially successful songs to date, peaking at number five on the U.K. dance chart.

His remix of Lana Del Rey's "Summertime Sadness" released in July 2013, reached the Top Ten of the U.K., Australia, and U.S. charts and earned him a Grammy award for Best Remix on the following year.

Studio albums

Extended plays

Singles

As lead artist

As featured artist

Other songs
 2001: Burning [Ultra Records]
 2002: Talking About The Revolution (Cedric Gervais and Maurizio Ruggiero presents 440 Central) [Hydrogen Records]
 2003: Let's Keep It Real (featuring Christy Prais) [Ultra Records]
 2004: Chemical Reaction (Cedric Gervais and DJ Pedro presents French Sleaze) [Sleaze Industries]
 2007: Spirit in My Life
 2009: Experiment
 2009: Mauri's Dream
 2009: Miamication
 2009: Disclaimer
 2009: No Offense [Sleaze Industries]
 2010: Leave Me Alone
 2012: You Got The Look
 2013: Deja Vu
 2013: Flip [Toolroom Records]
 2013: The Look
 2013: Snowmass
 2013: Put Em High [Spinnin']
 2013: Deception (with Borgore) [Spinnin']
 2013: Things Can Only Get Better (with Howard Jones) [3Beat / Spinnin']
 2013: Never Come Close (with CID) [Spinnin']
 2014: The Look [Spinnin']
 2014: Hashtag
 2015: De Ja Vu [Spinnin']
 2016: With You (featuring Jack Wilby)
 2016: Skin On Skin (featuring Luciana)
 2016: Make Me Feel (with Willy Monfret)

DJ mixes
 2003: The House Sessions [Sunswept Music]
 2007: Yoshitoshi Miami [Yoshitoshi Recordings]
 2008: Yoshitoshi Space Miami Terrace [Yoshitoshi Recordings]

Remixes
2007: JdotP - 'Sid Bubble'
2011: BT - 'Le Nocturne De Lumiere'
2012: Katy Perry - 'Wide Awake'
2012: Borgore - 'Decisions'
2012: Willy Moon - 'Yeah Yeah'
2013: Dido - 'End of Night'
2013: Lana Del Rey - 'Summertime Sadness'
2013: Mish Mash - 'Speechless' (with A. Becks)
2013: Florence + the Machine - 'You Got The Love'
2013: Lana Del Rey - 'Young & Beautiful'
2014: Miley Cyrus - 'Adore You'
2015: Odesza featuring Zyra - 'Say My Name'
2016: Cedric Gervais - 'With You'
2016: Sigala featuring John Newman and Nile Rodgers - 'Give Me Your Love'
2016: Clean Bandit featuring Louisa Johnson - 'Tears'
2017: David Guetta featuring Nicki Minaj and Lil Wayne - Light My Body Up
2017: Sigrid - 'Don't Kill My Vibe'
2017: Cedric Gervais featuring Lisa Owen - 'Somebody New' (with Lauren Simeca)
2017: Madison Beer vs Cedric Gervais - 'Dead'
2017: J Balvin and Willy William - 'Mi Gente'
2017: Niall Horan - 'Too Much to Ask'
2017: Kelly Clarkson - 'Love So Soft'
2017: The Vamps - 'Personal'
2018: Cedric Gervais and Just Kiddin featuring Kyan - 'Good Things' (Disco Edit)
2019: DJ Snake, J. Balvin and Tyga - 'Loco Contigo'
2019: Au/Ra - 'Dance in the Dark'
2019: D.O.D - 'According to Me'
2019: Dope Lemon - 'Hey You'
2020: Alicia Keys - 'Time Machine'
2020: Cedric Gervais - 'Spirit In My Life' (2020 Edit)
2020: R Plus and Dido - 'Together'
2021: Pink - 'All I Know So Far'

References

Discographies of French artists